Jaime Frontera (born 30 November 1940 in Mayagüez, Puerto Rico) is a Puerto Rican former basketball player who competed in the 1964 Summer Olympics and in the 1968 Summer Olympics.  He was the flag bearer for Puerto Rico in the 1968 Summer Olympics.  He was one of the torch lighters of the 2010 Central American and Caribbean Games.  He is a member of Phi Sigma Alpha fraternity.

References

1940 births
Living people
Puerto Rican men's basketball players
Olympic basketball players of Puerto Rico
Basketball players at the 1964 Summer Olympics
Basketball players at the 1968 Summer Olympics
Basketball players at the 1959 Pan American Games
Basketball players at the 1963 Pan American Games
Basketball players at the 1967 Pan American Games
Pan American Games medalists in basketball
Pan American Games silver medalists for Puerto Rico
Pan American Games bronze medalists for Puerto Rico
People from Mayagüez, Puerto Rico
Medalists at the 1963 Pan American Games
20th-century Puerto Rican people